The Titan T-51 Mustang is a three-quarter scale replica of the P-51 Mustang that was designed by Titan Aircraft owner John Williams. It is a two-seat homebuilt aircraft with dual controls and tandem seats, and has remarkable performance given the small size of the engine.

T-51 kits are fabricated by Titan Aircraft Company at South Austinburg, Ohio in the United States and are being assembled and flown in several countries where they are popular with pilots and particularly with spectators at airshows.

Titan has a long history with building a variety of aircraft to be flown under ultralight regulations, now including the FAA Light-sport Aircraft category. Pilots choose whether they want to buy a kitset which is fully complete and ready to assemble or a basic kitset to which they add their own choices of propellers, engines, and instruments.

When scaled down the Titan T-51 is not wide enough to fit a standard aircraft engine, so the Titan T-51 incorporates light-sport and ultralight type aircraft engines. The most frequently applied powerplant is the Rotax 912ULS/3, which produces , but the Rotax 914 UL3, which produces , is also fitted by owners wanting even higher performance. Some builders also consider Mazda Rotary engines due to their power-to-weight ratios and their dependability. The current engine of choice for the T-51 is the Suzuki H engine, specifically the H27A 2.7L V6, which generates .

The construction-to-flying time for the Titan T-51 is about 1400–1600 hours, and jigs or complicated tools are not required.

Specifications

See also

Stewart S-51D Mustang
Jurca Gnatsum
W.A.R. P-51 Mustang
Loehle 5151 Mustang
Papa 51 Thunder Mustang
Cameron P-51G
FK-Lightplanes SW51 Mustang

References

Citations

Bibliography
Titan Aircraft website
Aircraft specification brochure

External links

Homebuilt aircraft
2010s United States sport aircraft
T-51
Single-engined tractor aircraft
Low-wing aircraft
North American P-51 Mustang replicas